Aspergillus sergii is a species of fungus in the genus Aspergillus first isolated from almonds and maize in Portugal. It is from the Flavi section. It has been reported to produce aflatoxin G, aflatoxin B, and cyclopiazonic acid.

Growth and morphology

A. sergii has been cultivated on both Czapek yeast extract agar (CYA) plates and Malt Extract Agar Oxoid® (MEAOX) plates. The growth morphology of the colonies can be seen in the pictures below.

References

Further reading

sergii
Fungi described in 2012